Dembitzer is a surname. Notable people with the surname include:

Benny Dembitzer, British economist
Haim Nathan Dembitzer (1820–1892), Polish rabbi and historian

See also
Dembitzer Records, record label

Jewish surnames
Yiddish-language surnames